Sędławki  is a village in the administrative district of Gmina Bartoszyce, within Bartoszyce County, Warmian-Masurian Voivodeship, in northern Poland, close to the border with Kaliningrad Oblast in Russia.

Manor house
The village is the site of a well-preserved manor house, built in neoclassical style in the second half of the 19th century when the area was part of German East Prussia. It was first owned by the Puttlichs, and later became the residence of the Jahn family whose most notable member was Marie-Luise (see below).

The house was abandoned during the East Prussian Offensive in World War II. After the end of the Cold War, it was restored in 2000.

Notable residents
 Marie-Luise Jahn (1918–2010), resistance fighter
 Oskar Gottlieb Blarr (born 1934), German composer

References

Villages in Bartoszyce County